Hadi Alwai (1932 - 27 September 1998) is an Iraqi Marxist intellectual, Islamic historian, and Arab linguist. He was born in Baghdad and grew up in a poor family of Hashemite descent. He studied at Baghdad University and graduated from the college of Economics in 1956. He left Iraq and travelled to China and then Syria. He lived in exile until he died in Damascus and he was buried there. He is interested in topics of Islam and Chinese philosophy. He has researches and books on Islam, Chinese history, and language.

Biography 
Hadi Alwai was born in Baghdad in 1932 or 1933 and he grew up there in a poor family who lived in Karada Maryam, which is a rural suburb in Baghdad. His father was uneducated, he was a worker. His grandfather Salman was a religious scholar but he died when Hadi was five years old. When Hadi was fourteen, he began reading. He found what was left in his grandfather's library, which had been neglected by the illiterate. He was first educated from his grandfather's library, Mr. Salman. He memorized the Qur’an and Nahj al-Balagha, in addition to a lot of Arabic poetry. He finished high school in 1950 and graduated from the College of Commerce and Economics in 1956.

He participated in the Iraqi national movement since the fifties of the twentieth century. Then he changed to the Marxist approach. He established close relationship with the communist movement, and in 1976 he was forced to leave Iraq. He moved between China, Britain, Lebanon and Syria.

Al- Alwai died in Al-Shami Hospital in Damascus on 26 or 27 September 1998 and he was buried there.

His opinions and ideas 
The first research about him was published in 1960 in “Al-Muthaqaf magazine”. In his writings, Alwai was interested in the modern Arab and Islamic scientific renaissance. He considered that the first Arab renaissance began with Sadr al-Din al-Shirazi and not with the French campaign against Egypt.

He was unique among his Iraqi and Arabs contemporary intellectuals with his ideas which were about the East and his knowledge related to the Islamic and Chinese civilization, and his knowledge of the Latin, Hebrew, Aramaic and Chinese languages. He sought complete impartiality, impersonation and limitlessness of the intellectual, until he was called the cosmic intellectual. He was known to be a Sufi with his tendency and behavior and his contributions to the heritage of Eastern Sufism.“In this context, he does not glorify the East nor preserve its religious and mythological taboos. Rather, he interprets them and searches for human destinies through his relational systems and various environments.”

For him, Islamic history is a system of progressive progression of its previous stages and has internal dynamics, economically, socially, politically and culturally. In his view, there is no theological cognitive break between Jahiliyya and Islam. Rather, there was a transformative knowledge that led to changing the mechanism of relationships and their closed institutions by turning them into a new totalitarian system on the ideological and authoritarian levels.

Alwai searched for his linguistic project, of which only three dictionaries were completed. The dictionaries were a new form of the Arabic language by combining it between the spoken and classical dialects, in order to bring the common and written levels closer which are used by scholars, knowledge and culture. He took steps to break the academic rules of language by introducing spoken vocabulary and synonyms versus classical in his writings and researches without converging into “sukuniya” and its conservative laws. He worked on a project to reform the Arabic language "by facilitating syntax approximation between the writing language and the language of speech, and addressing the problems of the idiom language."

Works 

 "In Islamic Politics", (original text: fi alsiyasat al'iislamia) 1974
 "From the History of Torture in Islam", (original text: min tarikh altaedhib fi al'Islam) 1986
 "Political Assassination in Islam", (original text: alaightial alsiyasi fi al'Islam) 1988
 “Chapters from the History of Political Islam,”  (original text: fsul min tarikh al'Islam alsiyasii) he compiled three of his books into one volume, 1999
 “The Visible and the Invisible in Literature and Politics,” (original text: almaryiy walllamariiy fi al'adab walsiyasa) a collection of articles and studies, 1998
 "Sufi Orbits", (original text: madarat sufia) The Legacy of the Communal Revolution in the East, 1997
 "Chapters on Women", (original text: fusul ean almar'a) 1996
 "Non-anxious personalities in Islam", (original text: shakhsiat ghyr qaliqa fi al'Islam) 1995
 "The New Subversive", (original text: almustatraf aljadid) 1980
 "The Book of the Tao", (original text: kitab alttaw) Laotze, translation and study, 1995
 "The Contemporary Arabic Dictionary", (original text: almaejam alearabiu almueasir) of which two parts were published, the first of which was "The Dictionary of Human and Society"  (original text: qamus al'iinsan walmujtamae) in 1997, and the second was "The Dictionary of State and Economics." (original text: qamus aldawla walaiqtisad)

References 

Iraqi writers
Linguists from Iraq
Arab linguists
Iraqi communists
Hashemite people
1932 births
1998 deaths
Iraqi emigrants to China